Mielno  is a village in the administrative district of Gmina Mieleszyn, within Gniezno County, Greater Poland Voivodeship, in west-central Poland.

During the German occupation (World War II), in 1939, the Germans carried out massacres of Poles in Mielno, the first already on September 9, 1939, in the second week of the invasion of Poland.

References

Mielno